HGC Apparel is a US apparel, located in Wilmington, Delaware.

History 
In 2006, Marcia Smith launched an apparel line as a Black woman-owned and operated company.

In 2019, HGC was featured as Black by Popular Demand. Falke, The Style That Binds Us, and HGC Apparel are currently represented by the Communications Bureau.

In 2021, The Grammys' most inclusive and varied gift bags feature businesses owned and operated by people of all races, ethnicities, sexual orientations, genders, ages, disabilities, and more. The "Respect Protect Love the Black Woman" scarf by HGC Apparel was a tribute to Black culture.

BTS, Taylor Swift, Harry Styles, Cardi B, Brandi Carlile, Maren Morris, Dua Lipa, John Mayer, and Post Malone were among the top performers at Grammy Awards Gift bags.

The 2021 "Mother's Day in Hollywood" Gift Bag by HGC Apparel features the Respect Protect Love The Black Woman scarf.

HGC paid tribute to Paul Mooney, often known as the Godfather of Comedy, who died at the age of 79.

References